DMX (born Earl Simmons; 1970–2021) was an American rapper.

DMX may also refer to:

People
 DMX Krew (born Ed Upton), British electronic music artist
 Davy DMX (born David Reeves; born 1960) American hip hop music pioneer

Science
 5-Dehydro-m-xylylene, the first organic molecule known to violate Hund's rule
 Depressive mixed state, a psychological disorder
 DmX gene, an extremely large WD-protein coding gene found in eukaryotes

Technology
 DMX512, a communications protocol that is most commonly used to control stage lighting and effects
 Digital motion X-ray, a video-based X-ray system
 Symmetrix DMX, a series of enterprise storage arrays by EMC Corporation
 Data Mining Extensions, a query language for data mining models
 DMX, a protocol for fracture modeling in geoscience

Other uses
 DMX (music service), a retail environment company
 Oberheim DMX, a drum machine manufactured by Oberheim
 National Weather Service Des Moines, Iowa, whose office identification code is DMX

See also
 Dextromethorphan (DXM)